Fritz Hansen, also known as Republic of Fritz Hansen, is a Danish furniture design company. Designers who have worked for Fritz Hansen include Arne Jacobsen (1902–1971), Poul Kjærholm (1929–1980), Hans J. Wegner (1914–2007) and Piet Hein (1905–1996). Fritz Hansen also collaborates with contemporary furniture architects including Hiromichi Konno, Cecilie Manz, and Kasper Salto.

History

Fritz Hansen was founded in 1872, when Fritz Hansen, a Danish carpenter, founded his own furniture company and in 1915 introduced his first chair in steam bent wood. In 1934, Fritz Hansen began his collaboration with Arne Jacobsen resulting in some of the famous, classic icons of Danish Design including the 'Ant' (1952), the 'Series 7' (1955), the 'Grand Prix' (1957) the 'Swan' (1958), and the 'Egg' (1958). Other famous collaborations have resulted in Piet Hein's super-elliptical table from 1968 and in 1982 Fritz Hansen acquired the rights to a major part of Poul Kjærholm's furniture collection. Since the 1980s continuing into the new millennium, Fritz Hansen has added new designs to the collection including the Essay table by Cecilie Manz, T-NO1 by Todd Bracher, RIN chair by Hiromichi Konno, Plano tables by Pelikan Design and the Ice series by Kasper Salto.

Design Icons

Designers
Fritz Hansen manufactures the works of designers such as Arne Jacobsen, Poul Kjærholm, Cecilie Manz, Hiromichi Konno, Piero Lissoni, Morten Voss, Bruno Mathsson, Todd Bracher, Hans J. Wegner, Hans S. Jakobsen, Kasper Salto, Pelikan Design, Jehs+Laub and Piet Hein.

Style 
Products made by Fritz Hansen usually display characteristic Scandinavian designs where functionality predominates esthetics. Hence, Fritz Hansen's creations mainly show minimalistic designs, with refined lines and recurring use of wood.

See also
Danish modern

References

External links
http://www.fritzhansen.com
http://danishinteriordesign.tumblr.com/fritz_hansen

Design companies of Denmark
Furniture companies of Denmark
Companies based in Allerød Municipality
Danish modern
Danish companies established in 1872
Design companies established in 1872